Idaea lycaugidia is a moth of the family Geometridae first described by Louis Beethoven Prout in 1932. It is found in northern Madagascar.

This species has a wingspan of 14–18 mm and looks similar to Idaea lilliputaria (Warren, 1902) in shape and general aspect.

References

Sterrhini
Moths described in 1932
Moths of Madagascar